The Patoka-class oilers were a series of eight fleet replenishment oilers built for the United States Navy after World War I.  All but one of the vessels were commissioned between 1919 and 1922, and all were held in various states until the eve of World War II, where all served with the Navy for the duration of the war.  All eight survived the war, after which they were decommissioned and scrapped.

Ships in class 
 Patoka (AO-9)
 Sapelo (AO-11)
 Ramapo (AO-12)
 Trinity (AO-13)
 Rapidan (AO-18)
 Salinas (AO-19)
 Sepulga (AO-20)
 Tippecanoe (AO-21)

References

Auxiliary replenishment ship classes
Auxiliary ship classes of the United States Navy
 Patoka class oiler
 Patoka class oiler